Ian J. Goodfellow (born ) is an American computer scientist, engineer, and executive, most noted for his work on artificial neural networks and deep learning. He was previously employed as a research scientist at Google Brain and director of machine learning at Apple and has made several important contributions to the field of deep learning including the invention of the generative adversarial network (GAN). Goodfellow co-wrote  the textbook Deep Learning (2016) and wrote the chapter on deep learning in the most popular textbook in the field of artificial intelligence, Artificial Intelligence: A Modern Approach (used in more than 1,500 universities in 135 countries).

Education

Goodfellow obtained his B.S. and M.S. in computer science from Stanford University under the supervision of Andrew Ng (co-founder and head of Google Brain), and his Ph.D. in machine learning from the Université de Montréal in April 2014, under the supervision of Yoshua Bengio and Aaron Courville. Goodfellow's thesis is titled Deep learning of representations and its application to computer vision.

Career
After graduation, Goodfellow joined Google as part of the Google Brain research team. In March 2016 he left Google to join the newly founded OpenAI research laboratory.  Barely 11 months later, in March 2017, Goodfellow returned to Google Research but left again in 2019.

In 2019 Goodfellow joined Apple as director of machine learning in the Special Projects Group. He resigned from Apple in April 2022 to protest Apple's plan to require in-person work for its employees. Goodfellow then joined DeepMind as a research scientist.

Research
Goodfellow is best known for inventing generative adversarial networks (GAN), using deep learning to generate images. This approach uses two neural networks to competitively  improve an image’s quality. A “generator” network creates a synthetic image based on an initial set of images such as a collection of faces. A “discriminator” network tries to detect whether or not the generator's output is real or fake. Then the generate-detect cycle is repeated. For each iteration, the generator and the discriminator use the other's feedback to improve or detect the generated images, until the discriminator can no longer distinguish between the fakes generated by its opponent and the real thing. The ability to create high quality generated imagery has increased rapidly. Unfortunately, so has its malicious use, to create deepfakes and generate video-based disinformation. 

At Google, Goodfellow developed a system enabling Google Maps to automatically transcribe addresses from photos taken by Street View cars and demonstrated security vulnerabilities of machine learning systems.

Recognition
In 2017, Goodfellow was cited in MIT Technology Review's 35 Innovators Under 35. In 2019, he was included in Foreign Policy's list of 100 Global Thinkers.

References

American computer scientists
Artificial intelligence researchers
Google employees
Living people
Machine learning researchers
People from San Francisco
Stanford University School of Engineering alumni
Université de Montréal alumni

Year of birth missing (living people)
1980s births
Place of birth missing (living people)
Apple Inc. employees